CM Browser was a web browser developed by Cheetah Mobile. The browser is based on Chromium and supports both the WebKit and Trident browser engines. Jinshan Network claims that CM Browser is the first secure dual-engine browser with a "browser intrusion prevention system".

On June 3, 2013, CM Browser was released on Android and iOS.

Controversies 
Version 1 of CM Browser used version 17 of Chromium, which was much lower than the official version of Chromium. This prevented the use of the Chrome Web Store on CM Browser.

On September 21, 2014, Jinshan was ordered to pay Youku ¥300,000 for violating Chinese competition laws by allowing CM Browser to filter video ads on Youku's website. In the preceding trial, Youku claimed to suffer an economic loss as a result of CM Browser's ad filtering, as the company earned revenue from ads and premium subscriptions that allowed users to skip ads. Jinshan stated that CM Browser's ad filtering feature was vendor-neutral and that users must opt-in to activate the feature.

In November 2018, the Shanghai Consumer Protection Committee commissioned an evaluation of the application permissions of 18 popular mobile apps, including CM Browser. The study found that CM Browser requested sensitive phone- and SMS-related permissions that allowed the browser to monitor the phone's outbound calls. A representative for CM Browser responded that the browser needed to determine whether a phone call is active in order to prevent interference when the browser is playing audio. The representative indicated that CM Browser would be updated to address the privacy concerns.

In February 2020 all of Cheetah's applications have been pulled from the Play Store. Following that, Forbes exposed the company's practices of spying on its users based on a report published by Gabriel Cirlig, a security researcher. The report detailed how CM Browser was sending encrypted data to its Chinese servers exfiltrating the URLs visited by all its users and selling them to various third parties.

Ban in India 
In June 2020, the Government of India banned CM Browser along with 58 other Chinese origin apps, citing data and privacy concerns. The border tensions in 2020 between India and China might have also played a role in the ban.

See also
360 Secure Browser
QQ browser

Further reading

References

External links 

Web browsers
Windows web browsers
IOS web browsers
Android web browsers